"Blue Moon" is a song written, produced and performed by Beck, issued as the lead single from his twelfth studio album Morning Phase. The song is the musician's first release on Capitol Records (after leaving his previous label, Geffen Records). The song became Beck's first single to top the U.S. Adult Alternative Songs chart, and was nominated for Best Rock Song and Best Rock Performance at the 57th Grammy Awards. Beck performed the song on Ellen and Saturday Night Live.

Critical reception
The song has received positive reviews from critics. Kory Grow of Rolling Stone, while comparing the song's melody to material from Beck's 2002 album Sea Change, called the song "anything but desolate", as well as "lush". Leonie Cooper of NME called the song "one of the most captivating things Beck has ever composed".

Personnel
Beck Hansen – vocals, piano, acoustic guitar, electric bass, ukulele, charango
Joey Waronker – drums, percussion
Roger Joseph Manning, Jr. – clavinet, background vocals

Charts

Weekly charts

Year-end charts

References

External links
 

2014 singles
Beck songs
Capitol Records singles
Song recordings produced by Beck
Songs written by Beck
2014 songs